Sharon, Mississippi may refer to:

 Sharon, Jones County, Mississippi, a census-designated place in the United States
 Sharon, Madison County, Mississippi, an unincorporated community in the United States